My Brother's Blues is the fourth album from bluesman Benny Turner.  My Brother's Blues, released in 2017, is a tribute to Turner's brother and bandmate, Freddie King.  The album contains 11 titles from King's songbook, all chosen because they have special meaning to Turner.

Track listing 
 Big Legged Woman
 It's Your Move
 Have You Ever Loved a Woman
 I'm Tore Down
 You've Got to Love Her with a Feeling
 I'm Ready
 See See Baby
 Mojo Boogie
 Wee Baby Blues
 Ghetto Woman
 Same Old Blues

Personnel 
 Benny Turner – bass, lead vocals, background vocals, lead guitar, tambourine
 Earl Smith – background vocals
 Kathy Murray – background vocals
 June Yamagishi – lead guitar
 Derwin "Big D" Perkins – rhythm guitar
 Jack Miele – lead guitar, rhythm guitar
 Alonzo Johnson – bass
 Keiko Komaki – keyboards, B3
 Joe Krown – keyboards, B3
 Davell Crawford – B3
 Chizuko Yoshihiro – piano
 Barney Floyd – trumpet
 Tracy Griffin – trumpet
 Jason Mingledorff – saxophone
 Greg Dawson – saxophone
 Jeffery "Jellybean" Alexander – drums

Guests

 Otis Clay – lead vocals, background vocals
 Roosevelt Collier – lap steel
 Carolyn Wonderland – background vocals, lead guitar, rhythm guitar
 Marva Wright – lead vocals (appears from a previous recording)

Awards and reviews 
Global Music Awards – Silver Medal for Outstanding Achievement – February 2018

16th Independent Music Awards – Nominee for Tribute CD

Placed #32 on Living Blues Radio Chart's Top 50 Blues Albums for 2017

"On this project, Benny once again proves that he can hold his own with the best of them in the music business, and if you like classic soul blues with horns and righteous keyboards, this album will certainly tickle your blues fancy." – Blues Blast Magazine

References 

Texas blues
Chicago blues albums